You My Rose Mellow is a 1988 South Korean film directed by Park Chul-soo and starring Lee Deok-hwa and Lee Bo-hee. The film is based on the poetry collection with the same name by poet Do Jong-hwan.

Plot
Jong-hwan and Su-kyung meet in a cafe. Jong-hwan is a high-school teacher and Su-kyung is a cafe maid. They fall in love and marry; however, when Jong-hwan goes to take care of his family, Su-kyung gets ill, forcing him to care for her.

Cast
Lee Deok-hwa ...  Jong-hwan
Lee Bo-hee ... Su-kyung
Jung Hye-sun
Kwon Sung-duck
Moon Mi-bong
Mun Chang-gil
Chung Hae-sung
Park Hui-u
Choe Sung-kwan
Kim Gi-jong

References

External links
 
 

South Korean romantic drama films
Films directed by Park Chul-soo
1988 films
1980s Korean-language films